The Lutheran Diocese of Wrocław is one of the six dioceses of the Evangelical Church of the Augsburg Confession in Poland.

Location 
The Lutheran Diocese of Wrocław is located in western Poland. It ranges from Kłodzko in the south to the Baltic Sea coast in the north.
The territory of the Lutheran Diocese of Wrocław comprises Lower Silesia, Lubusz, and the western part of West Pomerania.

Organizational structure 
Today, the Lutheran Diocese of Wrocław has 16 parishes. Current bishop is Ryszard Bogusz since 1994.

List of Bishops 
Waldemar Preiss : 1947~1952
Gustaw Gerstenstein : 1952~1958
Waldemar Lucer : 1958~1979
Józef Prośpiech : 1980~1994
Ryszard Bogusz : 1994~

External links 
Official Homepage of Lutheran Diocese Wroclaw (pol.)

Christianity in Wrocław
Evangelical Church of the Augsburg Confession in Poland
Lutheran dioceses in Poland